Riccardo Moraschini (born January 8, 1991) is an Italian professional basketball player for Reyer Venezia Mestre of the Italian Lega Basket Serie A (LBA) and the EuroCup.

Professional career
After working his way through the youth ranks of Virtus Bologna he made his Serie A, and Euroleague, debut in 2007–2008, however he only started to play consistent minutes from 2009 to 2010.
Struggling to break into a strong team, he was loaned to fellow Serie A side Angelico Biella for the second part of the 2010–11 season and then to Legadue side Sant'Antimo the following season in order to play more.

After still not holding a starting place following these loans and the 2012–13 season he moved on to rival Acea Virtus Roma on a 1-year contract.
With Virtus he would play in the Eurocup and reach the play-off semifinals, however he did not convince the team to extend his contract and became a free agent.

He then moved to Serie A2 side Dinamica Mantova.

On July 20, 2016, Moraschini signed with the Italian team Aquila Basket Trento.

On July 13, 2018, Moraschini signed a deal with New Basket Brindisi.

On July 16, 2019, Moraschini signed a three-year contract with Olimpia Milano of the EuroLeague.
On January 3, 2022, Moraschini received a one-year suspension by the Italian National Anti-Doping Tribunal (TNA), after testing positive for clostebol metabolite, an anabolic steroid.

On July 2, 2022, he has signed with Reyer Venezia Mestre of the Italian Lega Basket Serie A (LBA).

Italian national team 
He started in the under age categories of the Italian national basketball team, most notably winning the silver medal at the 2011 FIBA Europe Under-20 Championship where he was a starter, before joining the senior team first in 2011 and then on a regular basis from 2013, playing a marginal part in FIBA EuroBasket 2015 qualification in which they qualified for FIBA EuroBasket 2015.

Player profile
Athletic and strong, Moraschini is more oriented to drive than to shoot - his athletic abilities allow him to obtain fouls even against taller players or score close to the basket. His biggest weakness is his shot, which he needs to develop to have a career at the highest level.

Career statistics

Euroleague 

|-
| style="text-align:left;"| 2007–08
| style="text-align:left;"| VidiVici Bologna
| 2 || 2 || 17.33 || 0.0 || 0.0 || 0.0 || 1.0 || 0.0 || 1.5 || 0.0 || 0.0 || -1.0
|- class="sortbottom"
| style="text-align:left;"| Career
| style="text-align:left;"|
| 2 || 2 || 17.33 || 0.0 || 0.0 || 0.0 || 1.0 || 0.0 || 1.5 || 0.0 || 0.0 || -1.0

Eurocup 

|-
| style="text-align:left;"| 2013–14
| style="text-align:left;"|  Acea Virtus Roma
| 10 || 0 || 14.28 || 50.0 || 27.3 || 77.8 || 1.9 || 1.1 || 0.5 || 0.1 || 4.4 || 4.4
|- class="sortbottom"
| style="text-align:left;"| Career
| style="text-align:left;"|
| 10 || 0 || 14.28 || 50.0 || 27.3 || 77.8 || 1.9 || 1.1 || 0.5 || 0.1 || 4.4 || 4.4

Lega Basket Serie A

Regular season

|-
| style="text-align:left;"| 2007-08
| style="text-align:left;"| Virtus Bologna
| 12 || 5 || 3.2 || 0.0 || 100.0 || 0.0 || 0.4 || 0.0 || 0.4 || 0.0 || 0.6
|-
| style="text-align:left;"| 2008-09
| style="text-align:left;"| Virtus Bologna
| 5 || 2 || 1.5 || 0.0 || 0.0 || 0.0 || 1.0 || 0.0 || 0.0 || 0.0 || 0.0
|-
| style="text-align:left;"| 2009-10
| style="text-align:left;"| Virtus Bologna
| 26 || 20 || 9.9 || 29.2 || 35.7 || 66.7 || 0.8 || 0.6 || 0.5 || 0.1 || 2.1
|-
| style="text-align:left;"| 2010-11
| style="text-align:left;"| Virtus Bologna
| 15 || 12 || 10.6 || 31.3 || 16.7 || 60.0 || 1.3 || 0.3 || 0.4 || 0.0 || 1.6
|-
| style="text-align:left;"| 2010-11
| style="text-align:left;"| Angelico Biella
| 14 || 13 || 11.4 || 56.5 || 25.0 || 80.0 || 0.8 || 0.6 || 0.6 || 0.0 || 3.2
|-
| style="text-align:left;"| 2012-13
| style="text-align:left;"| Virtus Bologna
| 25 || 22 || 14.3 || 45.8 || 10.0 || 70.5 || 2.0 || 0.9 || 0.5 || 0.1 || 4.1
|-
| style="text-align:left;"| 2013-14
| style="text-align:left;"| Acea Virtus Roma
| 30 || 27 || 10.8 || 41.5 || 20.8 || 92.9 || 1.4 || 0.6 || 0.5 || 0.0 || 2.7
|- class="sortbottom"
| style="text-align:left;"| Career
| style="text-align:left;"|
| 127 || 101 || 8.81 || 29.18 || 29.74 || 52.87 || 1.01 || 0.42 || 0.41 || 0.02 || 1.95

Playoffs

|-
| style="text-align:left;"| 2008-09
| style="text-align:left;"| Virtus Bologna
| 2 || 1 || 1.0 || 0.0 || 0.0 || 0.0 || 0.0 || 0.0 || 0.0 || 0.0 || 0.0
|-
| style="text-align:left;"| 2009-10
| style="text-align:left;"| Virtus Bologna
| 5 || 5 || 14.0 || 25.0 || 40.0 || 0.0 || 1.4 || 0.2 || 0.6 || 0.2 || 1.6
|-
| style="text-align:left;"| 2013-14
| style="text-align:left;"| Acea Virtus Roma
| 8 || 7 || 10.9 || 50.0 || 50.0 || 0.0 || 1.1 || 0.1 || 0.1 || 0.0 || 1.4
|- class="sortbottom"
| style="text-align:left;"| Career
| style="text-align:left;"|
| 15 || 13 || 8.63 || 25.0 || 30.0 || 0.0 || 0.83 || 0.1 || 0.23 || 0.06 || 1.0

References

External links

Riccardo Moraschini at euroleague.net
Riccardo Moraschini at RealGM.com

1991 births
Living people
Aquila Basket Trento players
Basketball players at the 2020 Summer Olympics
Italian men's basketball players
Lega Basket Serie A players
New Basket Brindisi players
Olimpia Milano players
Olympic basketball players of Italy
Pallacanestro Virtus Roma players
Point guards
Reyer Venezia players
Sportspeople from the Province of Ferrara
Shooting guards
Virtus Bologna players